Danilo Arona is an Italian writer, journalist, freelance writer and essayist, born in Alessandria, Piedmont, where he currently lives.

He has also been involved for years with fantasy literature and cinema, and has followed any reference or appearance of fantasy in the news and in Italian society.

Works

Essays

Guida al fantacinema, Gammalibri
Guida al cinema horror, Ripostes
Nuova guida al fantacinema - La maschera, la carne, il contagio, Puntozero
Tutte storie - Immaginario italiano e leggende contemporanee, Costa & Nolan 1994
Vien di notte l'Uomo Nero - Il cinema di Stephen King, Falsopiano 1997
Satana ti vuole, Corbaccio
Possessione mediatica, Marco Tropea Editore, 1998
Wes Craven - Il buio oltre la siepe, Falsopiano, 1999

Novels
Arona has also written a number of fanta-noir novels, all set in Italy, including:

La penombra del gufo,  Amnesia
Un brivido sulla schiena del Drago, Amnesia
La pianura fa paura, Editoriale AGP
Il vento urla Mary, PuntoZero
Rock, Solid Books 2002
L'ombra del dio alato, Marco Tropea, 2003
L'esorcista, il cinema, il mito, Falsopiano, 2003
Palo Mayombe, Dario Flaccovio, 2004
La stazione del dio del suono, Larcher, 2004
Cronache di Bassavilla, Dario Flaccovio, 2006
Black Magic Woman, Frilli, 2006
Finis Terrae, Mondadori, 2007
Melissa Parker e l'incendio perfetto, Dino Audino, 2007
Santanta, Perdisa, 2008
L'estate di Montebuio, Gargoyle Books, 2009
Ritorno a Bassavilla, Edizioni XII, 2009

References

Italian fantasy writers
Italian journalists
Italian male journalists
People from Alessandria
Living people
Year of birth missing (living people)